The 12835/12836 Hatia - Yesvantpur Superfast Express is a Superfast train that runs between  and Yesvantpur

Service

Route and halts 

The important halts of the train are:

 
 
 
 
 
 
  
 
 
 
 
 
 
  
 
 
 Katpadi Junction

Coach composition

The train has LHB coach with max speed of 160 kmph. The train consists of 23 coaches:

 2 AC 2 Tier Coaches
 6 AC 3 Tier Coaches
 1 AC Pantry Car
 7 Sleeper Coaches
 5 Second Class (Unreserved)
 2 Generator Car

Direction reversal

The train reverses its direction once:

Running status 

12835 – leaves Hatia every Sunday and Tuesday at 18:25 hrs IST and reach on 3day at SMVT Bangalore at 3:15 hrs IST.
12836 – leaves Yesvantpur Junction every Wednesday and Friday at 8:30 hrs IST and reaches Hatia the next day at 19:05 hrs IST.

Traction
From Hatia to Visakhapatnam Junction Royapuram/Tatanagar Loco Shed Base WAP 4 and Visakhapatnam Junction to Yesvantpur Krishnarajapuram Loco Shed Base WAP 7 HOG until its end

Rake-sharing 

 Jharkhand Swarna Jayanthi Express

References
Notes

Sources

External links 
 12835/Hatia–Yesvantpur Superfast Express India Rail Info
 12836/Yesvantpur–Hatia Superfast Express India Rail Info

Transport in Ranchi
Transport in Bangalore
Express trains in India
Rail transport in Jharkhand
Rail transport in Odisha
Rail transport in Andhra Pradesh
Rail transport in Tamil Nadu
Rail transport in Karnataka